Uncial 088 (in the Gregory-Aland numbering), α 1021 (Soden), is a Greek uncial manuscript of the New Testament, dated paleographically to the 5th or 6th century.

Description 

To the present day survived only two parchment leaves of this codex (23.5 cm by 20 cm). The leaves are arranged in quarto in quire. They contain a small parts of the 1 Corinthians 15:53-16:9, and the Titus 1:1-13. The text is written in two columns per page, 24 lines per page, in very large uncial letters.

It is a palimpsest, the upper text is in Georgian from 10th century.

Text 

The Greek text of this codex is a representative of the Alexandrian text-type with some alien readings. Aland placed it in Category II.

In 1 Corinthians 15:52 it reads εγερθησονται (as p46, Sinaiticus, B C Ψ 075 0121a 0243 Byz); other manuscripts read αναστησονται (as A D F G P);

In 1 Corinthians 15:53 it has singular reading την αθανασιαν for αθανασιαν;

In 1 Corinthians 15:54 it lacks το φθαρτον τουτο ενδυσηται αφθαρσιαν και along with 0121a, 0243, 1175, 1739;

In 1 Corinthians 16:2 it has reading σαββατου (A, B, C, D, F, G, P, Ψ, 33) against σαββατων (075, 0121a, 0243, and Byzantine manuscripts);

History 

Currently it is dated by the INTF to the 5th or 6th century.

The text of the manuscript was edited by Constantin von Tischendorf. It was examined and described by Kurt Treu.

The codex currently is located at the Russian National Library (Gr. 6, II, fol. 5-6) at Saint Petersburg.

See also 
 List of New Testament uncials
 Biblical manuscript
 Textual criticism

References

Further reading 

 Constantin von Tischendorf, Monumenta sacra inedita I, pp. XII-XIX, 45-48.
 Kurt Treu, Die Griechischen Handschriften des Neuen Testaments in der USSR; eine systematische Auswertung des Texthandschriften in Leningrad, Moskau, Kiev, Odessa, Tbilisi und Erevan, T & U 91 (Berlin: 1966), pp. 20-21.

Greek New Testament uncials
6th-century biblical manuscripts
Palimpsests
National Library of Russia collection